The Cathedral of Christ the King is a Roman Catholic cathedral located in Lexington, Kentucky, United States.  It is the seat of the Diocese of Lexington.

History

Christ the King Parish was established in the Diocese of Covington on July 22, 1945.  Initially, Mass and other parish functions were held in the chapel at St. Catherine's Academy.  The Rev. George J. O'Brien was named the parish's first pastor.  He had to resign soon after because of ill health and was replaced by the Rev. Richard O'Neill.  The parish moved to its current site on May 12, 1946.  Parish functions were held in a pre-fabricated structure.  Christ the King School was opened in 1951 and the Sisters of Divine Providence formed the initial faculty.  The present church and rectory was built in the Modern and art deco architectural styles from 1965 to 1967 for $1.5 million.  On January 14, 1988 Pope John Paul II established the Diocese of Lexington,  and Christ the King became the cathedral for the new diocese.  The Cathedral Center was added to the parish facilities in 1992.

modern day 
"We are a Roman Catholic parish that seeks transformation by the Holy Spirit to a parish focused on evangelizing, forming, equipping and sending forth missionary disciples of Jesus Christ into the world." A quote directly taken from the Cathedral of Christ the King to describe themselves in the modern day. The pastor who oversees the Church is the Bishop of Lexington, which currently is John Stowe The church is described as a Roman Catholic parish.  They focus their mission on evangelizing, forming, equipping, and sending out missionary forces to act as disciples of Jesus Christ.

Covid-19 
body the church has been impacted by COVID-19 since the start of the pandemic. "I would have never dreamed that we would ever cancel confessions; but these are very challenging times." This is a quote directly taken from Father Paul who recently retired as Rector of Cathedral of Christ the king. Although the church may claim religious exemption from COVID-19 they have decided to move confessions to an appointment-based system to do their part and slow the spread.

See also
List of Catholic cathedrals in the United States
List of cathedrals in the United States

References

External links
Official Cathedral Site
Roman Catholic Diocese of Lexington Official Site

Churches in Lexington, Kentucky
Modernist architecture in Kentucky
Christian organizations established in 1945
Roman Catholic churches completed in 1967
Christ the King Lexington
Roman Catholic churches in Kentucky
Roman Catholic Diocese of Lexington
20th-century Roman Catholic church buildings in the United States